The Sohodol is a right tributary of the river Bârsa in Romania. It flows into the Bârsa west of Râșnov.

References

Rivers of Romania
Rivers of Brașov County